Nick Johnson (born August 25, 1986) is an American professional ice hockey forward who is currently an unrestricted free agent who most recently played with the South Carolina Stingrays of the ECHL.

Playing career
Undrafted out of Sacred Heart University, he first played professionally with HC Plzeň in the Czech Extraliga during the 2010–11 Czech Extraliga season. After his third season with Plzeň in 2012–13 and helping the franchise to its first championship, Johnson left as a free agent and signed a one-year contract in the German DEL, with newcomers, the Schwenninger Wild Wings on August 12, 2013.

After spending the first seven seasons of his professional career abroad in the Czech Republic and Germany, Johnson returned to North America as a free agent to sign a one-year ECHL contract with the South Carolina Stingrays on August 4, 2017. Johnson began the 2017–18 season on the Stingrays top offensive line and recorded 6 goals and 10 points in 16 games before opting for a mutual release from his contract on January 23, 2018.

Awards and honors

References

External links

1986 births
American men's ice hockey forwards
HC Dynamo Pardubice players
HC Plzeň players
Ice hockey players from Connecticut
Living people
People from Windsor, Connecticut
Sacred Heart Pioneers men's ice hockey players
Schwenninger Wild Wings players
South Carolina Stingrays players
Grizzlys Wolfsburg players
AHCA Division I men's ice hockey All-Americans
American expatriate ice hockey players in the Czech Republic
American expatriate ice hockey players in Germany